Grass Show (often written Grass~Show®) was a Britpop-inspired indie band from Sweden, active in the mid- to late-1990s. The band released one album in the United Kingdom, Something Smells Good In Stinkville (1997), from which there were three singles, "1962", "Freak Show" and "Out Of The Void". The album contains a cover version of the Ace of Base song, "All That She Wants".

The artwork Grass Show's releases was notable as it often portrayed imagery of 1950s American families, which were juxtaposed with surreal and absurd elements. For example, the sleeve for the "1962" single has images of families cooking trainers.

Discography

Albums
 Something Smells Good In Stinkville (June 1997), Food
"Freak Show"
"1962"
"Out of the Void"
"Unreal World"
"Cavemankind"
"All That She Wants"
"Talk Talk Talk"
"Make Love Not War"
"Losing Touch"
"Love 180"
"Alice"
"Getting You Out of My Head"

 Vertigo (2001), Dorkland/Egging Records - Japan only release
"Vertigo"
"Mundane Days"
"This Is Your Life"
"Easy"
"When You're A Boy"
"Face Off"

UK singles

References

Swedish indie rock groups
Parlophone artists
Swedish musical groups